This is a list of the 9 observers to the European Parliament for Latvia in the 1999 to 2004 session. They were appointed by the Latvian Parliament as observers from 1 May 2003 until the accession of Latvia to the EU on 1 May 2004.

List

Sources
Ministry of Foreign Affairs 

Latvia
2003
Latvia